Sarrainodu is a 2016 Indian Telugu-language action film written and directed by Boyapati Srinu and produced by Allu Aravind's Geetha Arts. The film stars Allu Arjun, Rakul Preet Singh, Catherine Tresa, Srikanth, and Aadhi Pinisetty. Brahmanandam, Sai Kumar, Jayaprakash, Pradeep Rawat, Suman, and Adarsh Balakrishna play supporting roles.. S. Thaman scored the film. 

The film was released on 22 April 2016 in Telugu. Sarrainodu was dubbed into Malayalam as Yodhavu and released in Kerala a month after the Telugu version. It was a major commercial success at the box office and became the 2nd highest grossing Telugu film of 2016. It received positive reviews from critics who praised Arjun and Aadhi's performances, action sequences, cinematography, visuals and direction, but criticized its screenplay and characters.

Plot
Indian Army Major Gana leaves the army and becomes a vigilante to punish crooked people who escaped justice due to faults in the legal system, He is raised by his paternal uncle Sripathi, who supports his cause but Gana's father Umapathi berates him for not having an aim in life. 

One day, Gana is sent to a neighboring village to meet his prospective bride, Mahalakshmi Jaanu. She is the daughter of his father's friend, Jaya Prakash, who is an ex-IAS officer. However, Gana meets Hansitha Reddy, who is revealed to be the local MLA and falls for her. He tells an imaginary story to Umapathi that Jaanu rejected him, because he gets into fights. Vairam Dhanush is the son of Cheif Minister Reddy, who kills a farmer for refusing to hand over the land documents. Later, a rapist named Veerendra, seeks Dhanush's help as he actually raped and killed a girl. The girl's parents seek Hansitha's help where they file the petition in the court. 

However due to Dhanush's influence, lack of evidence and the embarrassment faced in the court. The girl's parents commit suicide. Enraged, Gana thrashes Dhanush's lawyer and chops Veerandra's legs, which enrages Dhanush and decide to search for the unknown person (Gana). After learning his actions, Hansitha falls for Gana and promises to marry him if he swears in the presence of God that he will not indulge in violence, When Gana is about to do so, at the temple, A badly injured Jaanu arrives, running from Dhanush's henchmen who try to kill her. Gana strikes everyone, who tried to kill her and ultimately gives Jaanu courage. At Gana's house, Jaanu reveals that she didn't reject Gana.

Gana had arrived at Jaanu's village and had saved her from Obul Reddy, who is working for Dhanush. Then, Gana had declined the marriage. Jaanu explains how Dhanush tried to blackmail Jaya Prakash when he had been protecting farmers so that they would not have to sell their lands for laying down of oil pipelines. This incident infuriatated Dhanush, who kills the farmers, but Jaanu intervenes, where she slaps and insults Dhanush. Dhanush kills Jaya Prakash and tries to kill her, but she narrowly escaped and had ran for days to find Gana. Gana decides to solve her problems. He goes to Dhanush's home where he battles with his henchmen and tries to burn Dhanush alive, but Dhanush escapes. 

Gana is questioned for the attack but claims that other people had thrashed Dhanush. Eventually, Obul Reddy reveals the truth about the atrocities that Dhanush committed in the village, and the media is thrown into an uproar. Dhanush arrives at DGP Ranjit's office to surrender. However, Dhanush shoots Ranjit and tries to kill Umapati, but Sripati takes the shot and left for dead. Reddy stops Dhanush from shooting anyone else and tells Umapati to call Gana and make him surrender to Dhanush. Gana arrives and is told that Sripati will be saved if he surrenders, Gana does so and is stabbed by Dhanush and his men. Reddy then tells Dhanush to kill Sripati, which enrages Gana into killing Reddy's bodyguards and Reddy. 

Gana then fights Dhanush and decapitates him with an axe, when he tries to run over Sripathi and Umapathi. Later, Gana and Ranjit tells a cover story to the media that Reddy and Dhanush were killed while trying to protect Ranjit from unknown terrorists. Gana then announces Hansitha as a new candidate to become the new Chief Minister.

Cast

Production
Boyapati Srinu wrote the script with Allu Arjun in mind for the lead. He wanted to cast Samantha Ruth Prabhu who acted with Arjun in S/O Satyamurthy (2015), but it did not happen. Rakul Preet Singh leading role and Catherine Tresa supporting role. It is Singh's first collaboration with Arjun and Tresa's third collaboration with him after Iddarammayilatho (2013) and Rudhramadevi (2015). Tamil actor Aadhi was chosen as the main antagonist. Srikanth, Sai Kumar, Suman and Jayaprakash were chosen for other important roles. Priyamani, Anushka Shetty and Disha Patani were reported to have been approached for an item number. However, it was Anjali who danced in the number with Arjun.

Release
The filmmakers aimed for a Sankranthi release (15 January 2016) due to principal photography delay, the release date was postponed. The film was scheduled to release on 8 April 2016 coinciding with Allu Arjun's birthday, because of post-production delays, the release date was postponed again. The worldwide release date was moved to 22 April 2016.

The film was later dubbed in Hindi and released on YouTube by Goldmines Telefilms on 28 May 2017. Currently, the Hindi dubbed version of the movie holds over 700+ million views on YouTube.

Box office

Critical reception
 The Times of India wrote "The film has nothing new to narrate and fails to keep you glued to the seats throughout. The hackneyed plot and lack of novelty make this film a regular watch, this film is something for the masses." 123 Telugu wrote "Sarrainodu is indeed an oora mass entertainer. The film has many elements which will enthrall the fans and mass general audience. Bunny's stunning transformation, Aadhi's screen presence and amazing action sequences are huge assets." Suresh Kavirayani of Deccan Chronicle felt the core plot of the movie to have been inspired by the 2004 movie Walking Tall.

Soundtrack 

The film score and soundtrack album were composed by S. Thaman. This is Thaman's second collaboration with Allu Arjun after Race Gurram. Lahari Music acquired the audio rights of the film for an undisclosed price and it was announced that the audio launch event will take place on 20 March 2016, but it was pushed to April, since the audio launch of Sardar Gabbar Singh took place on the same day. The makers later announced that there will be no audio launch for this film and it was also announced that the album will hit the stores directly on 2 April 2016. The film features six songs with lyrics by Sri Mani, Ramajogayya Sastry, Anantha Sriram, Krishna Chaitanya and Bunny Suresh.
 
The album received positive reviews from critics. 123Telugu in their review stated it as, Thaman has been criticized for scoring those routine numbers with his trade mark drum beats. But one should not forget that he always comes up with some chart topping songs all the time. Same is the case with Sarainodu too. Thaman sticks to the formula and gives what is the need of the hour, some foot tapping hit numbers. Blockbuster, You are my MLA, Telusa Telusa and Atiloka Sundari are our picks and will become huge hits. Finally, like always, Allu Arjun has a thumping music album where he can show off his crazy dance moves and impress everyone like the way this album does. Behindwoods rated the album 2.75 out of 5 and stated it as "Sarrainodu is another fun filled album for Allu Arjun from S.S.Thaman. The album is quite stylish and impressively presented." Times of India rated the album 3.5 out of 5, stating that "The album is peppered with hits and is sure to do well." Indiaglitz rated the album 3.25 out of 5, with a verdict "Thaman's music keeps in mind the demands of a mega-talented dancer like Allu Arjun.  Apart from that, the tunes are interesting.  The singers are better than the lyrics."

The album was well received by audiences, and it has been trending on top in Apple Music as well as on radio charts. The audio success meet was held on 10 April 2016 at RK Beach in Vishakapatnam, with Chiranjeevi attending the event as chief guest. The song "Blockbuster" was well received it was later reused as "Vera Level" in Tamil film Ayogya (2019) which is a Tamil remake of Temper.

Accolades

64th Filmfare Awards South 
Best Actor – Allu Arjun – Nominated
Best Music Director – S. S. Thaman – Nominated
Best Male Playback Singer – Dhanunjay – "You Are My MLA" – Nominated
Filmfare Critics Award for Best Actor – South – Allu Arjun – Won
Best Female Playback Singer – Shreya Ghoshal- "Blockbuster" – Nominated

6th South Indian International Movie Awards 

 Best Supporting Actor (Telugu) – Srikanth - Won
 Best Actor (Telugu)-Allu Arjun - Nominated
 Best Actor in a Negative Role (Telugu) - Aadhi Pinisetty - Nominated

15th Santosham Film Awards 

 Best Director – Boyapati Srinu - Won
 Best Supporting Actor – Srikanth - Won
 Best Villain – Aadhi Pinisetty -Won
 Best Female Comedian – Vidyullekha -Won

References

External links
 

2016 films
2010s Telugu-language films
2016 action films
Indian action films
2010s masala films
Films directed by Boyapati Srinu
Films scored by Thaman S
Geetha Arts films
Films shot in Bolivia
Films shot in Hyderabad, India
Films shot at Ramoji Film City